The 2005 European U23 Judo Championships is an edition of the European U23 Judo Championships, organised by the International Judo Federation. It was held in Kyiv, Ukraine from 19 to 20 November 2005.

Medal summary

Medal table

Men's events

Women's events

Source Results

References

External links
 

European U23 Judo Championships
 U23
European Championships, U23
Sports competitions in Kyiv
Judo competitions in Ukraine
Judo
Judo, European Championships U23
International sports competitions hosted by Ukraine
2000s in Kyiv